Rubin Carter (born December 12, 1952) is a former American football player and coach. He most recently served as defensive line coach for Purdue University.  Carter played professionally as a defensive tackle in the National Football League (NFL) with the Denver Broncos from 1975 to 1986  Carter was the head coach of the Florida A&M Rattlers football team from 2005 to 2007. Carter has been the defensive line coach at the University of New Mexico under head coach Mike Locksley. Carter graduated from Fort Lauderdale's Stranahan High School in 1971.  Carter was inducted into the University of Miami Sports Hall of Fame in 1992. Carter is African-American.   He is the father of Andre Carter.

Coaching career

Florida A&M
In July 2005, Carter replaced Billy Joe to become the new head coach at Florida A&M University. In the 2005 and 2006 seasons, Carter compiled 6–5 and 7–4 records, respectively. After compiling a 3–8 record in the 2007 season, Florida A&M fired Carter, citing that the university needed to "move in a new direction".

Purdue
On December 5 2015, Carter was hired as the defensive line coach for the Purdue Boilermakers football team. On November 29, 2015, Carter's contract was not renewed by Purdue.

Head coaching record

References

1952 births
Living people
American football defensive tackles
Denver Broncos coaches
Denver Broncos players
Florida A&M Rattlers football coaches
Howard Bison football coaches
Miami Hurricanes football players
Maryland Terrapins football coaches
New Mexico Lobos football coaches
New York Jets coaches
Purdue Boilermakers football coaches
San Jose State Spartans football coaches
Temple Owls football coaches
Towson Tigers football coaches
Washington Redskins coaches
High school football coaches in Florida
All-American college football players
People from Pompano Beach, Florida
Sportspeople from Broward County, Florida
Coaches of American football from Florida
Players of American football from Florida
African-American players of American football
African-American coaches of American football
20th-century African-American sportspeople
21st-century African-American sportspeople
Ed Block Courage Award recipients